Saleh El-Ali (born 14 July 1956) is a Syrian long-distance runner. He competed in the men's 5000 metres at the 1980 Summer Olympics.

References

External links

1956 births
Living people
Athletes (track and field) at the 1980 Summer Olympics
Syrian male long-distance runners
Olympic athletes of Syria
Place of birth missing (living people)
20th-century Syrian people